A crash/ride cymbal is a medium weight, slightly tapered cymbal, normally in the  range, designed to serve in a drum kit as both a crash and a ride cymbal.

A ride/crash cymbal may be thought to be the same thing, but is actually different. Despite being similar in design and function to a crash/ride, it is slightly heavier and/or less tapered to optimise the ride rather than the crash function. It is far less common than the crash/ride.

Crash/ride and ride/crash cymbals have several uses:

 In a very small kit, one may be the only suspended cymbal, used as both crash and ride.
 Some beginners' cymbal packs have only three cymbals: A pair of hi-hats, and a crash/ride. However most cymbal packs even at entry level have separate ride and crash cymbals, and the drum hardware packs sold with most drum kits include stands for two suspended cymbals.
 Many early drum kits had only one tom and one cymbal, both mounted on the bass drum. This cymbal would nowadays be called a crash/ride; At the time it would simply have been called a medium, if anything.
 In a large kit, they bridge the gap between the largest crash cymbal and the smallest ride.
 At very soft volumes, one will provide a more conventional ride tone than a full-sized ride cymbal.
 At very loud volumes, they provide fuller and longer crashes than conventional crash cymbals, which may sound for too short a time.

References

Cymbals